Kenan Kamenjaš (born January 17, 2000) is a Bosnian professional basketball player for Budućnost VOLI in the Prva A Liga and the ABA League. He is a 2.07 m tall center. He also represents the Bosnia and Herzegovina national team internationally.

Professional career

Studentski centar
On July 7, 2021, Kamenjaš officially moved to ABA League club Studentski centar on a four-year contract. On April 25, 2022, Kamenjaš was selected for 2022 ABA League Ideal Starting Five.

Career statistics

Adriatic League

|-
| style="text-align:left;"| 2021–22
| style="text-align:left;"| Studentski centar
| style="background:#cfecec;"| 26* || 16 || 27.6 || .632 || .143 || .586 || style="background:#cfecec;" | 8.4* || 2.0 || 1.1 || 0.2 || 14.3

References

External links
 KENAN KAMENJAŠ at Aba-liga.com
 Kenan Kamenjas International Stats at Basketball-reference.com
 Kenan Kamenjas C  #34 at Basketball.realgm.com

2000 births
Living people
ABA League players
Basketball players from Sarajevo
Bosnia and Herzegovina men's basketball players
Centers (basketball)
KK Budućnost players
KK Studentski centar players
OKK Spars players